Zurab Gogochuri (born 22 March 1990 in Tbilisi) is a Georgian high jumper.

He won the high jump during the 2013 European Team Championships and 2017 European Team Championships.

References

External links
IAAF Athlete’s profile

High jumpers from Georgia (country)
Athletes (track and field) at the 2015 European Games
European Games competitors for Georgia (country)
Sportspeople from Tbilisi
1990 births
Living people